The World Assembly of Muslim Youth is an international Islamic educational organization whose stated purpose is “preserve the identity of Muslim youth and help overcome the problems they face in modern society”. Reportedly the world's largest Muslim organization, WAMY organizes conferences, symposia, educational workshops and research circles to address youth and students issues, in addition to football tournaments and European Muslim Scouts camps for Muslim youth in Europe. Along with the Muslim World League, it is part of a "worldwide network of largely Saudi-funded groups...promoting Islamic teachings and encouraging Muslims to be more religiously observant, as well as providing interested non-Muslims and recent converts with information about Islam". It maintains satellite chapters in 31 other countries and is affiliated with some 196 other Muslim youth groups on five continents.

History
WAMY was founded in Riyadh, Saudi Arabia in 1972 and has offices in countries with significant Muslim populations throughout the world. WAMY was co-founded by Muslim member Kamal Helwabi and Abdullah. Abdullah served as president through 2002, and was later treasurer.  Abdullah also incorporated WAMY's U.S branch at Falls Church, Virginia in 1992. Kamal Helwabi went on to serve as WAMY's executive director until 1982.

According to the Pew Research Center, between the 1970s and 1990s, the activities of the Muslim, the Muslim World League and the World Assembly of Muslim Youth in Europe became "so intertwined that it was often difficult to tell them apart". It further notes that the influence of WAMY and MWL has waned somewhat as social media and blogs have "made it easier for other groups to reach wide audiences".

Aims
WAMY's South African branch aims "to preserve the Muslim identity, to help overcome the problems Muslim youth face in modern society", and to "educate and train Muslim youth in order for them to become active and positive citizens in their countries". WAMY aims to introduce Islam to non-Muslims in its "purest form as a comprehensive system and way of life" and "to establish a relationship of dialogue, understanding and appreciation between other faith organizations".

It organizes conferences, symposia, workshops and research circles to address youth and students issues. WAMY publishes material that introduces Islam to non-Muslims. WAMY organizes exchange visits, Hajj and Umrah trips and provide training and support to Muslim youth organizations.

The website of WAMY's UK branch states their aim to "build bridges of peace and unity in our multicultural society. ...Through educating the Muslim youth to the common good and promoting understanding among people of different communities."

Both the Muslim World League and WAMY are widely seen to be promoting the strict Wahhabi interpretation of Islam prevalent in Saudi Arabia, due to Saudi funding and influence on it.

Scholarships
The organization helps and funds students all over the world.

Raids due to suspicions of terror
In May 2004, 50 FBI, U.S. Immigration and Customs Enforcement, and Joint Terrorism Task Force agents raided WAMY's office in the United States at Alexandria, Virginia. WAMY issued a statement saying that all of its computers and hard drives were seized in the raid, and a volunteer board member, Ibrahim Abdullah, was arrested on immigration charges. In a statement, WAMY strongly denied any terrorist ties and said the government had told them the probe is focused only

References

External links
الندوة العالمية للشباب الإسلامي – Official World website

Islamic youth organizations
Islamic organizations established in 1972
Youth organizations established in 1972
Union of Good
Youth organisations based in Saudi Arabia